The Dag Hammarskjöld Memorial Crash Site marks the place of the plane crash in which Dag Hammarskjöld, the second and then-sitting Secretary-General of the United Nations was killed on 17 September 1961, while on a mission to the Léopoldville Congo Republic (now the Democratic Republic of the Congo). The site is located 10 km from Ndola, in the Copperbelt Province of Zambia.

Site description
The Dag Hammarskjöld Crash Site was declared a national monument under notice number 14 of 1970 as a historical landmark. In 1964 the Dag Hammarskjöld Foundation Committee was formed to ensure that the memory of this world statesman lives forever in the country where he met his tragedy. At the Crash site a memorial garden was established with a cairn at the centre and a lawn around it with a belt of shrubs and trees on the outer circle. A museum was constructed and official opened at the site in 1981. The museum exhibits some remains of the tragic accident. The museum is also used for collecting materials and books on the life of Dag Hammarskjöld and the role of the United Nations.

A road was built to the crash site, and a memorial was constructed, after Zambia gained its independence in 1964.

The memorial is located 10 km west-north-west of Ndola on the Dag Hammarskjöld memorial access road off the Ndola-Kitwe Dual Carriageway, just south of the Simon Mwansa Kapwepwe International Airport.

Göran Björkdahl interviewed several witnesses around the crash site in the 2000s and studied archival documents related to the Katanga crisis. He wrote in 2011 that he believed Dag Hammarskjöld's death was a murder committed in part to benefit mining companies such as Union Minière.

World Heritage Status

This site was added to the UNESCO World Heritage Tentative List on 11 June 1997 in the Cultural category.

Notes

References
Dag Hammarskjöld Memorial (Crash site) - UNESCO World Heritage Centre Accessed 2009-02-24.
Gillett, N. (1970). Dag Hammarskjöld. Heron Books.

Monuments and memorials in Zambia
Ndola
Buildings and structures in Copperbelt Province
Tourist attractions in Copperbelt Province